The Missing Miniature is a 1954 West German comedy crime film directed by Carl-Heinz Schroth and starring Paola Loew, Ralph Lothar and Paul Westermeier. It is based on the 1935 story of the same name by Erich Kästner. It was shot at the Carlton Studios in Munich and on location in Copenhagen, Lübeck and Hanover. The film's sets were designed by the art directors Max Mellin and Wolf Englert.

Synopsis
While on holiday in Copenhagen, a butcher meets a young woman in a café and agrees to transport a miniature painting back to Germany for her. This soon leads to complications.

Cast

References

Bibliography 
 Bock, Hans-Michael & Bergfelder, Tim. The Concise Cinegraph: Encyclopaedia of German Cinema. Berghahn Books, 2009.

External links 
 

1954 films
1950s crime comedy films
German crime comedy films
West German films
1950s German-language films
Films directed by Carl-Heinz Schroth
Films set in Copenhagen
Films based on German novels
Films based on works by Erich Kästner
1954 comedy films
German black-and-white films
1950s German films
Films shot in Copenhagen